Four vessels of the Royal Navy have been named HMS Tees after the River Tees:
  was a 26-gun Conway-class post ship launched in 1817. She was used as a church ship from 1826 and sold at Liverpool in 1872.
 HMS Tees was to be a Camelion-class sloop ordered in 1860 but cancelled in 1863.
  was a Medina-class gunboat launched in 1876 and sold at Bristol in 1907.
  was a River-class frigate launched in 1943 and broken up in 1955.

References

 

Royal Navy ship names